Mac Andrew (born 4 December 2003) is a professional Australian rules footballer playing for the Gold Coast Suns in the Australian Football League (AFL).

Early life
Andrew was born in Cairo, Egypt, to South Sudanese parents. In 2005, at 18 months of age, he moved to Australia with his family. He began playing Australian rules football for Wantirna South at the under-9s level and also played basketball throughout his upbringing. Andrew progressed his with through the junior football ranks before being selected to represent the Dandenong Stingrays in the NAB League. He was also a member of the Melbourne Demons' Next Generation Academy but was later ruled ineligible to be selected by the Demons due to restrictions on NGA prospects bid on with first round picks. At the age of 17, Andrew was drafted to the Gold Coast Suns with pick 5 in the 2021 AFL draft and became the first player of South Sudanese heritage to be taken with a top five pick in the national draft.

AFL career

Andrew made his AFL debut for the Gold Coast Suns at 18 years of age against the West Coast Eagles in round 20 of the 2022 AFL season and became the first Egyptian-born player to debut in the AFL.

References

External links

2003 births
Living people
Gold Coast Football Club players
Australian people of South Sudanese descent
Sportspeople of South Sudanese descent
South Sudanese refugees
South Sudanese players of Australian rules football
Australian rules footballers from Melbourne
South Sudanese emigrants to Australia
Refugees in Egypt
People from the City of Knox